Farrash Kola may refer to:
 Farrash Kola-ye Olya
 Farrash Kola-ye Sofla